Catherine Repond  (18 August 1663 in Villarvolard – 15 September 1731 in Fribourg), was an alleged Swiss witch. She was one of the last people to be executed for sorcery in Switzerland prior to Anna Göldi.

In 1730, the bailiff Beat-Nicolas von Montenach, out hunting, injured a fox; the fox got away but, according to Montenach, shouted to him, with a human voice, that he had hurt it. At the same time, Catherine Repond sought refuge at a farm close to Villarvolard away from the bad weather. She was a beggar, reputed for sorcery, well known in the area, where she often performed chores at the farms. She had the same injuries which the fox had had, according to Montenach. Montenach then suspected that the fox had in fact been Repond.

Montenach had her arrested in April 1731 and taken to his castle in Corbières, where she was interrogated by torture to confess that she had flown on a broomstick to the witche's sabbath. She was then taken to Fribourg, where she was sentenced to death for witchcraft and executed by strangulation and burning.

In 1782, Anna Göldi, often called the last witch, was executed, but Göldi's trial was a dubious witch trial, while Repond was openly executed for this accusation.

References 

 http://www.praetor.ch/en/cv/poncet/histoires/12.htm
 http://www.swisscastles.ch/Fribourg/corbieres.html

Literature 
  « Le procès de la sorcière Catherine Repond dite Catillon: superstition ou crime judiciaire ?», Nicolas MORARD, in: « Annales fribourgeoises », publication de la société d'histoire du canton de Fribourg 1969-1970, t. 50, Fribourg, 1970, p. 13-80.
 « Les grands procès de l'histoire fribourgeoise: Catillon », P. Aeby, in: « Annales fribourgeoises », 1928, t. XVI, Fribourg, 1928 « Catillon et Capu », J.-B. Repond, Presses de l'printie, Les fils d'Alphonse Glasson S. A ., Bulle, 1985 « Catillon la sorcière », V. Tissot, in: « le Touriste », 1866, Nos 1-5
 « Essai sur la procédure pénale en matière de sorcellerie en Pays de Fribourg aux XVIe et XVIIe siècles », G. Bise, in: « Annales fribourgeoises », 1979-1980, Fribourg, 1980 Archives de l'Etat de Fribourg (AEF), Bailliage de Corbières, titres No 259, procédure de la sorcière Catherine Repond de Villarvolard, dite Catillon, 1731-1732 (6 liasses)

People executed for witchcraft
Executed Swiss women
People executed by Switzerland by burning
Swiss torture victims
1663 births
1731 deaths
Executed Swiss people
Witch trials in Switzerland